The discography of The Movielife, an American rock band, consists of four studio albums, one live album, four extended plays and four singles.

Studio albums

Live albums

Extended plays

Singles

Videography

References

Discographies of American artists
Pop punk group discographies